The 2009–10 Atlanta Thrashers season was the 11th season of play for the National Hockey League (NHL) franchise. The Thrashers failed to make the Stanley Cup playoffs during the season, and at the end of the regular season, the team announced that it would not retain John Anderson as head coach. The Thrashers also promoted Don Waddell to president and Rick Dudley to general manager. Assistant coaches Randy Cunneyworth, Todd Nelson and Steve Weeks were also not retained.

Off-season 
With the fourth-overall pick in the Entry Draft, the Thrashers chose forward Evander Kane.

The Thrashers signed free agent forward Nik Antropov, intending to team him with Ilya Kovalchuk. The Thrashers made a trade for defenceman Pavel Kubina from the Toronto Maple Leafs, giving up Garnet Exelby in a four-player deal.

Pre-season 

|- align="center" bgcolor="#FFBBBB"
| 1 || September 7 || @ Nashville Predators || 0-5 ||  || MacIntyre || 0-1-0
|- align="center" bgcolor="#BBBBBB"
| 2 || September 18 || @ Tampa Bay Lightning || 1-2 || OT || Pavelec ||0-1-1
|- align="center" bgcolor="#ccffcc"
| 3 || September 21 || Carolina Hurricanes  || 4-2 || || Hedberg ||1-1-1
|- align="center" bgcolor="#ccffcc"
| 4 || September 23 || Nashville Predators || 5-4 ||  || Pavelec || 2-1-1
|- align="center" bgcolor="#FFBBBB"
| 5 || September 25 || @ Carolina Hurricanes || 3-4 || || MacIntyre || 2-2-1
|- align="center" bgcolor="#FFBBBB"
| 6 || September 27 || Tampa Bay Lightning || 1-5 ||  || Pavelec || 2-3-1
|-

Regular season

Divisional standings

Conference standings

Game log 

 Green background indicates win (2 points).
 Red background indicates regulation loss (0 points).
 White background indicates overtime/shootout loss (1 point).

|- align="center" bgcolor="#ccffcc"
| 1 || October 3 || Tampa Bay Lightning || 3-6 || Atlanta Thrashers ||  || Pavelec || 18,545 || 1-0-0 || 2
|- align="center" bgcolor="#ccffcc"
| 2 || October 8 || Atlanta Thrashers || 4-2 || St. Louis Blues ||  || Pavelec || 19,150 || 2-0-0 || 4
|- align="center" bgcolor="#ffbbbb"
| 3 || October 10 || Atlanta Thrashers || 2-4 || Ottawa Senators ||  || Pavelec || 19,360 || 2-1-0 || 4
|- align="center" bgcolor="#ccffcc"
| 4 || October 16 || Atlanta Thrashers || 4-2 || New Jersey Devils ||  || Pavelec || 14,187 || 3-1-0 || 6
|- align="center" bgcolor="#ccffcc"
| 5 || October 17 || Atlanta Thrashers || 4-2 || Buffalo Sabres ||  || Hedberg || 18,690 || 4-1-0 || 8
|- align="center" 
| 6 || October 20 || Atlanta Thrashers || 1-2 || Montreal Canadiens || SO || Pavelec || 21,273 || 4-1-1 || 9
|- align="center" bgcolor="#ffbbbb"
| 7 || October 22 || Washington Capitals || 5-4 || Atlanta Thrashers ||  || Pavelec || 13,192 || 4-2-1 || 9
|- align="center" bgcolor="#ffbbbb"
| 8 || October 24 || San Jose Sharks || 4-3 || Atlanta Thrashers ||  || Hedberg || 14,945 || 4-3-1 || 9
|- align="center" bgcolor="#ffbbbb"
| 9 || October 29 || Washington Capitals || 4-3 || Atlanta Thrashers ||  || Pavelec || 12,893 || 4-4-1 || 9
|- align="center" bgcolor="#ccffcc"
| 10 || October 31 || Atlanta Thrashers || 3–1 || Ottawa Senators ||  || Pavelec || 17,297 || 5-4-1 || 11
|-

|- align="center" bgcolor="#ccffcc"
| 11 || November 3 || Atlanta Thrashers || 5-4 || Montreal Canadiens ||  || Pavelec || 21,273 || 6-4-1 || 13
|- align="center" bgcolor="#ffbbbb"
| 12 || November 5 || Columbus Blue Jackets || 4-3 || Atlanta Thrashers ||  || Pavelec || 10,878 || 6-5-1 ||13
|- align="center" bgcolor="#ffbbbb"
| 13 || November 7 || Atlanta Thrashers || 3-6 || New York Islanders ||  || Pavelec || 14,119 || 6-6-1 ||13
|- align="center" bgcolor="#ccffcc"
| 14 || November 8 || St. Louis Blues || 2-3 || Atlanta Thrashers || SO || Hedberg || 10,904 || 7-6-1 ||15
|- align="center" bgcolor="#ccffcc"
| 15 || November 12 || Atlanta Thrashers || 5-3 || New York Rangers ||  || Hedberg || 18,200 || 8-6-1 ||17
|- align="center" bgcolor="#ccffcc"
| 16 || November 13 || Los Angeles Kings || 0-7 || Atlanta Thrashers ||  || Pavelec || 15,638 || 9-6-1 ||19
|- align="center" bgcolor="#ccffcc"
| 17 || November 15 || Edmonton Oilers || 2-3 || Atlanta Thrashers ||  || Hedberg || 11,091 || 10-6-1 || 21
|- align="center"
| 18 || November 19 || Boston Bruins || 4-3 || Atlanta Thrashers || SO || Pavelec || 12,112 || 10-6-2 || 22
|- align="center" bgcolor="#ffbbbb"
| 19 || November 21 || Pittsburgh Penguins || 3-2 || Atlanta Thrashers ||  || Hedberg || 17,588 || 10-7-2 || 22
|- align="center"
| 20 || November 22 || Tampa Bay Lightning || 4-3 || Atlanta Thrashers || OT || Pavelec || 13,342 || 10-7-3 || 23
|- align="center" bgcolor="#ccffcc"
| 21 || November 25 || Atlanta Thrashers || 2-0 || Detroit Red Wings ||  || Pavelec || 19,751 || 11-7-3 || 25
|- align="center" bgcolor="#ccffcc"
| 22 || November 27 || Atlanta Thrashers || 6-4  || Carolina Hurricanes ||  || Pavelec || 14,463 || 12-7-3 || 27
|- align="center" bgcolor="#ccffcc"
| 23 || November 28 || Philadelphia Flyers || 0-1 || Atlanta Thrashers ||  || Hedberg || 16,018 || 13-7-3 || 29
|- align="center" bgcolor="#ccffcc"
| 24 || November 30 || Florida Panthers || 3-4 || Atlanta Thrashers ||  || Hedberg || 10,310 || 14-7-3 || 31
|-

|- align="center" bgcolor="#ffbbbb"
| 25 || December 3 || New York Islanders || 4-1 || Atlanta Thrashers ||  || Pavelec || 11,704 || 14-8-3 || 31
|- align="center" bgcolor="#ccffcc"
| 26 || December 5 || Atlanta Thrashers || 2-1 || Florida Panthers || SO || Hedberg || 13,291 || 15-8-3 || 33
|- align="center" bgcolor="#ffbbbb"
| 27 || December 7 || Atlanta Thrashers || 2-5 || Toronto Maple Leafs ||  || Pavelec || 19,050 || 15-9-3 || 33
|- align="center" bgcolor="#ffbbbb"
| 28 || December 9 || Atlanta Thrashers || 1-3 || Calgary Flames ||  || Hedberg || 19,289 || 15-10-3 || 33
|- align="center" bgcolor="#ffbbbb"
| 29 || December 10 || Atlanta Thrashers ||2-4  || Vancouver Canucks ||  || Pavelec || 18,810 ||15-11-3  ||33
|- align="center" bgcolor="#ccffcc"
| 30 || December 12 || Montreal Canadiens || 3-4 || Atlanta Thrashers || OT || Hedberg || 16,616 ||16-11-3  ||35
|- align="center" bgcolor="#ccffcc"
| 31 || December 14 || Atlanta Thrashers || 3-2 || New York Rangers || SO ||Hedberg   || 18,200 ||17-11-3  ||37
|- align="center" bgcolor="#ffbbbb"
| 32 || December 16 || Atlanta Thrashers ||3-4  || Florida Panthers ||  || Hedberg  || 11,672 ||17-12-3  ||37
|- align="center" bgcolor="#ccffcc"
| 33 || December 17 || Dallas Stars || 5-6 || Atlanta Thrashers || OT ||Pavelec   || 11,957 ||18-12-3  ||39
|- align="center" bgcolor="#ffbbbb"
| 34 || December 19 || New Jersey Devils || 5-4 || Atlanta Thrashers ||  || Pavelec  || 14,616 ||18-13-3  ||39
|- align="center"
| 35 || December 21 || Montreal Canadiens || 4-3 || Atlanta Thrashers ||OT  || Hedberg  || 15,075 ||18-13-4  ||40
|- align="center" bgcolor="#ffbbbb"
| 36 || December 23 || Atlanta Thrashers || 4-6 || Boston Bruins ||  || Hedberg  || 17,565 ||18-14-4  ||40
|- align="center" bgcolor="#ffbbbb"
| 37 || December 26 || Atlanta Thrashers ||3-4  || Tampa Bay Lightning ||  ||Pavelec   || 15,437 ||18-15-4  ||40
|- align="center" bgcolor="#ffbbbb"
| 38 || December 28 || Atlanta Thrashers || 2-3 || New Jersey Devils ||  || Hedberg  || 17,024 ||18-16-4  ||40
|- align="center" bgcolor="#ffbbbb"
| 39 || December 30 || Atlanta Thrashers ||0-4  || Boston Bruins ||  || Pavelec  || 17,565 ||18-17-4  ||40
|-

|- align="center" 
| 40 || January 1 || Atlanta Thrashers || 3-4 || Buffalo Sabres || OT || Hedberg  || 18,690 ||18-17-5  ||41
|- align="center"
| 41 || January 2 || Atlanta Thrashers ||5-6  || New York Islanders || SO || Hedberg  || 12,824 ||18-17-6  ||42
|- align="center" bgcolor="#ffbbbb"
| 42 || January 5 || Atlanta Thrashers || 2-5  || Pittsburgh Penguins ||  || Pavelec  || 17,049 || 18-18-6 ||42
|- align="center" bgcolor="#ccffcc"
| 43 || January 7 || New York Rangers || 1-2 || Atlanta Thrashers ||  || Hedberg  || 9,179 ||19-18-6  ||44
|- align="center" bgcolor="#ffbbbb"
| 44 || January 9 || Washington Capitals || 8-1 || Atlanta Thrashers ||  ||Hedberg || 16,767 ||19-19-6  ||44
|- align="center" bgcolor="#ccffcc"
| 45 || January 12 || Ottawa Senators || 1-6 || Atlanta Thrashers ||  ||Pavelec   || 10,017 ||20-19-6  ||46
|- align="center"
| 46 || January 14 || Buffalo Sabres || 2-1 || Atlanta Thrashers || OT || Pavelec  ||11,313  ||20-19-7  ||47
|- align="center" bgcolor="#ccffcc"
| 47 || January 16 || Atlanta Thrashers || 5-3 || Carolina Hurricanes ||  ||Pavelec   || 14,812 ||21-19-7  ||49
|- align="center" bgcolor="#ffbbbb"
| 48 || January 18 || Atlanta Thrashers || 0-1 || Florida Panthers ||  ||Hedberg  ||11,818  || 21-20-7 ||49
|- align="center" bgcolor="#ccffcc"
| 49 || January 19 || Toronto Maple Leafs || 3-4 || Atlanta Thrashers ||  || Pavelec || 10,208 || 22-20-7 ||51
|- align="center" bgcolor="#ffbbbb"
| 50 || January 21 || Carolina Hurricanes || 5-2 || Atlanta Thrashers ||  || Pavelec  || 10,472 ||22-21-7  ||51
|- align="center"
| 51 || January 23 || Atlanta Thrashers || 2-1 || Tampa Bay Lightning || SO || Hedberg   || 16,212 ||  22-21-8||52
|- align="center" bgcolor="#ccffcc"
| 52 || January 26 || Anaheim Ducks || 1-2 || Atlanta Thrashers ||  || Hedberg ||12,984  || 23-21-8 ||54
|- align="center" bgcolor="#ccffcc"
| 53 || January 28 || Atlanta Thrashers || 4-3 || Philadelphia Flyers ||  || Hedberg  ||19,611  || 24-21-8 ||56
|- align="center" bgcolor="#ffbbbb"
| 54 || January 30 || Atlanta Thrashers || 3-4 || Nashville Predators ||  || Hedberg ||16,646  ||24-22-8  ||56
|-

|- align="center" bgcolor="#ffbbbb"
| 55 || February 2 || Tampa Bay Lightning || 2-1 || Atlanta Thrashers ||  || Pavelec ||11,390  || 24-23-8 ||56
|- align="center" bgcolor="#ffbbbb"
| 56 || February 5 || Atlanta Thrashers ||2-5  || Washington Capitals ||  || Pavelec ||18,277  || 24-24-8 ||56
|- align="center" bgcolor="#ccffcc"
| 57 || February 6 || Florida Panthers ||2-4  || Atlanta Thrashers ||  || Hedberg|| 16,743 ||25-24-8  ||58
|- align="center"
| 58 || February 10 || Atlanta Thrashers ||3-4  || Colorado Avalanche || OT ||Hedberg  ||11,644 ||25-24-9  ||59
|- align="center" bgcolor="#ccffcc"
| 59 || February 12 || Atlanta Thrashers || 3-2 || Minnesota Wild ||  || Hedberg || 18,257 ||26-24-9  ||61
|- align="center"
| 60 || February 13 || Atlanta Thrashers || 4-5 || Chicago Blackhawks || SO || Pavelec ||22,275  ||26-24-10  ||62
|-

|- align="center" bgcolor="#ccffcc"
| 61 || March 2 || Florida Panthers || 2-4 || Atlanta Thrashers ||  || Hedberg ||13,818  || 27-24-10 ||64
|- align="center" bgcolor="#ccffcc"
| 62 || March 4 || New York Islanders || 3-6 || Atlanta Thrashers ||  || Hedberg || 14,776 || 28-24-10 ||66
|- align="center" bgcolor="#ffbbbb"
| 63 || March 6 || Atlanta Thrashers || 2-6 || Tampa Bay Lightning ||  || Hedberg || 19,926 || 28-25-10 ||66
|- align="center" bgcolor="#ffbbbb"
| 64 || March 7 || Carolina Hurricanes || 4-0 || Atlanta Thrashers ||  || Pavelec || 15,306 || 28-26-10 ||66
|- align="center" bgcolor="#ffbbbb"
| 65 || March 9 || Nashville Predators || 2-1 || Atlanta Thrashers ||  ||Hedberg  || 11,106 || 28-27-10 ||66
|- align="center" bgcolor="#ffbbbb"
| 66 || March 11 || Atlanta Thrashers || 1-2 || Columbus Blue Jackets ||  || Hedberg || 13,459 || 28-28-10 ||66
|- align="center" bgcolor="#ffbbbb"
| 67 || March 12 || New York Rangers || 5-2 || Atlanta Thrashers ||  ||Hedberg  || 15,571 ||28-29-10 ||66
|- align="center"
| 68 || March 14 || Phoenix Coyotes ||3-2 || Atlanta Thrashers || SO ||Pavelec  || 15,914 ||28-29-11  ||67
|- align="center" bgcolor="#ccffcc"
| 69 || March 16 || Buffalo Sabres || 3-4 || Atlanta Thrashers ||  || Hedberg || 12,540 || 29-29-11 ||69
|- align="center" bgcolor="#ccffcc"
| 70 || March 18 || Ottawa Senators || 3-6 || Atlanta Thrashers ||  || Hedberg ||12,718  || 30-29-11 ||71
|- align="center" bgcolor="#ccffcc"
| 71 || March 20 || Philadelphia Flyers || 2-5 || Atlanta Thrashers ||  ||Hedberg  || 17,024 ||31-29-11  ||73
|- align="center" bgcolor="#ccffcc"
| 72 || March 21 || Atlanta Thrashers || 3-1 || Philadelphia Flyers ||  ||Pavelec  || 19,575 || 32-29-11 ||75
|- align="center" bgcolor="#ffbbbb"
| 73 || March 23 || Boston Bruins || 4-0 || Atlanta Thrashers ||  || Hedberg || 14,042 || 32-30-11 ||75
|- align="center"
| 74 || March 25 || Toronto Maple Leafs || 2-1 || Atlanta Thrashers || OT || Pavelec || 14,148 || 32-30-12 ||76
|- align="center" bgcolor="#ccffcc"
| 75 || March 27 || Atlanta Thrashers || 4-0 || Carolina Hurricanes ||  || Hedberg || 16,108 || 33-30-12 ||78
|- align="center" bgcolor="#ffbbbb"
| 76 || March 29 || Carolina Hurricanes || 4-1 || Atlanta Thrashers ||  || Hedberg || 13,440 ||33-31-12||78
|- align="center" bgcolor="#ccffcc"
| 77 || March 30 || Atlanta Thrashers || 3-2 || Toronto Maple Leafs ||  || Pavelec ||19,079  || 34-31-12 ||80
|-

|- align="center" bgcolor="#ffbbbb"
| 78 || April 1 || Atlanta Thrashers || 1-2 || Washington Capitals ||  ||Pavelec  || 18,277 || 34-32-12 ||80
|- align="center"
| 79 || April 3 || Atlanta Thrashers || 3-4 || Pittsburgh Penguins || OT || Hedberg || 17,047 ||34-32-13  ||81
|- align="center" bgcolor="#ffbbbb"
| 80 || April 6 || New Jersey Devils || 3-0 || Atlanta Thrashers ||  || Hedberg || 12,038 || 34-33-13 ||81
|- align="center" bgcolor="#ffbbbb"
| 81 || April 9 || Atlanta Thrashers ||2-5  || Washington Capitals ||  ||  Pavelec|| 18,277 ||34-34-13  ||81
|- align="center" bgcolor="#ccffcc"
| 82 || April 10 || Pittsburgh Penguins || 0-1 || Atlanta Thrashers ||  ||Hedberg  ||18,959  ||35-34-13  ||83
|-

Player statistics

Skaters
Note: GP = Games played; G = Goals; A = Assists; Pts = Points; +/− = Plus/minus; PIM = Penalty minutes

Goaltenders
Note: GP = Games played; TOI = Time on ice (minutes); W = Wins; L = Losses; OT = Overtime losses; GA = Goals against; GAA= Goals against average; SA= Shots against; SV= Saves; Sv% = Save percentage; SO= Shutouts

†Denotes player spent time with another team before joining Thrashers. Stats reflect time with the Thrashers only.
‡Traded mid-season
underline/italics denotes franchise record

Awards and records

Records

Milestones

Awards

Transactions 

The Thrashers have been involved in the following transactions during the 2009–10 season.

Trades 

|}

Free agents acquired

Free agents lost

Claimed via waivers

Lost via waivers

Player signings

Draft picks 

Atlanta's picks at the 2009 NHL Entry Draft in Montreal, Quebec.

See also 
 2009–10 NHL season

References 

Atlanta Thrashers seasons
A
A
Atlanta Thrashers
Atlanta Thrashers